George Stack (12 March 1846 – 7 October 1930) was an Australian cricketer. He played two first-class matches for New South Wales between 1866/67 and 1868/69.

See also
 List of New South Wales representative cricketers

References

External links
 

1846 births
1930 deaths
Australian cricketers
New South Wales cricketers